The Outlet Collection at Riverwalk, previously known as Riverwalk Marketplace until 2014, is an outlet mall located in the Central Business District of New Orleans, Louisiana.  It is located along the Mississippi River waterfront, stretching from the base of Canal Street, upriver to the New Orleans Morial Convention Center.  It is connected to the adjacent Hilton New Orleans Riverside Hotel.

History
By the start of the 1980s, increased use of containers in shipping made some of the older riverfront wharves less useful, so the Poydras Street Wharf and the Julia Street Wharf were demolished, and the land was used as part of the 1984 World's Fair. After the fair, this section was redeveloped into the "Riverwalk," an upscale mall intended to attract both tourists and locals.

On the afternoon of Saturday, December 14, 1996, the MV Bright Field freightliner/bulk cargo vessel slammed into the mall. No one was killed in the accident, although approximately 66 were injured; fifteen shops were damaged. Damage to the mall, including the pier, condominium properties, shops, and hotel totaled an estimated $15 million (US). Physical damage to the Bright Field was calculated at $1,857,952 (US). The Bright Field was unable to be removed from the crash site until January 6, 1997. The spot where the Bright Field collided with the Riverwalk is marked on site with a plaque.

The mall closed for a few months after Hurricane Katrina, due to extensive wind and looting damage. It reopened in early December 2005, in hopes that Christmas shopping would jump-start the area's recovery. Only a small number of shops were able to open at first. Additional businesses slowly opened over the next several years, eventually bringing the mall back to near 100% occupancy.

In 2014, the mall closed temporarily and underwent an $82 million renovation. It reopened in May 2014 as The Outlet Collection at Riverwalk, becoming a outlet center, with shops which include a Coach, Inc., outlet and Neiman-Marcus Last Call Studio outlet.

References

External links

 The Outlet Collection at Riverwalk

Buildings and structures in New Orleans
Shopping malls in Louisiana
Shopping malls established in 1986
Outlet malls in the United States
Economy of New Orleans
Redeveloped ports and waterfronts in the United States
World's fair sites in Louisiana
Tourist attractions in New Orleans
Shopping malls in the New Orleans metropolitan area